The Missing Postman is a two-part comedy drama originally broadcast on BBC1 on the consecutive evenings of 29 and 30 March 1997. Adapted from the Mark Wallington novel, it received the award for Best BBC Comedy Drama at the British Comedy Awards in 1997.

Synopsis
When Dorset postman Clive Peacock is forced into early retirement, the years ahead look bleak. But on his last day in the job, in a moment of unexpected rebellion he makes a decision that will change his life. As he makes his final collection from the postbox in the small seaside town where he lives, he decides to deliver the letters himself, by hand, no matter the destination. Mounting his trusty bicycle, he sets off on what proves to be an odyssey of self-discovery. Pursued by the police and lionised by the media, Clive becomes both a fugitive and a reluctant hero.

Cast

 James Bolam	... 	Clive Peacock
 Alison Steadman	... 	Christine Peacock
 Jim Carter... 	DS Lawrence Pitman
 Gwyneth Strong	... 	WPC Rachel McMahon
 Stephen Moore	... 	Ralph
 Barbara Dickson	... 	Linda Taylor
 Larry Lamb... 	Trevor Ramsay
 Sam Loggin       ...     Patricia Flint
 Colin McCredie     ...   Greg

External links

1997 British television series debuts
1997 British television series endings
1990s British comedy-drama television series
1990s British television miniseries
BBC television dramas
BBC Scotland television shows
British comedy-drama television shows
English-language television shows
Television shows set in Dorset